Bruno Munk London (born 5 June 1975), known professionally as Jimmy London, is a Brazilian musician, ex lead singer and co-founder of the hardcore punk band Matanza. In addition to his musical career, he was also the host of Pimp My Ride Brasil and the voice of "Fornalha", a character in the cartoon The Jorges, both appearing on MTV Brasil. He has also acted as a record producer, including the EP of garage rock band De'la Roque, whose drummer, Jonas, also plays in Matanza.

Controversy 
He earned a reputation for having an explosive temper after two distinct incidents. In the first, he had a misunderstanding which nearly turned into a fight with the lead singer of NX Zero, Di Ferrero, at a football match. In the second, he got into an argument with the hosts of TV show Rockgol, Paulo Bonfá e Marco Bianchi, live on national TV. This was viewed by some as a possible marketing ploy designed to promote Pimp My Ride Brasil, which he hosted.

References

External links 
 

Brazilian singer-songwriters
Brazilian heavy metal singers
Musicians from Rio de Janeiro (city)
Brazilian television presenters
MTV people
1975 births
Living people
21st-century Brazilian singers